Happy Like An Autumn Tree is the second full-length album by Cyann & Ben. It was released on 19 October 2004 on Gooom Disques.

Track listing
"Circle"
"(Silences and Little Melodies For...)"
"Gone to Waste"
"(Close to Discovery)"
"A Moment Nowhere"
"(Tide)"
"Summer"
"Obsessing and Screaming Voice in a Shell"

2004 albums